The Civil Aviation Authority of Thailand (CAAT), is an independent agency of the Thai government under the oversight of the Minister of Transport. Its responsibilities includes prescribing, regulating, and auditing Thai civil aviation. 

It was formed in October 2015 from the split of the Department of Civil Aviation (DCA) into two separate agencies in response to the International Civil Aviation Organization's downgrading of Thailand's aviation safety rating. The other body split from the DCA is the Department of Airports (DOA), which operates airports previously managed by the DCA.

References

External links
 Civil Aviation Authority of Thailand  (English)
 Civil Aviation Authority of Thailand  (Thai)
 Flight Information Region In Thailand 
 Thailand Civil Aviation Authority Working Hours

See also

 Aircraft Accident Investigation Committee

Aviation organizations based in Thailand
Civil aviation in Thailand
Independent administrative organizations of Thailand
Thailand